William Dennis "Midget" Jones (April 8, 1887 – October 10, 1946) is a former Major League Baseball player. He played two seasons with the Boston Rustlers / Braves from 1911 to 1912.

References

External links

1887 births
1946 deaths
Baseball people from New Brunswick
Boston Rustlers players
Boston Braves players
Canadian expatriate baseball players in the United States
Major League Baseball outfielders
People from Carleton County, New Brunswick
Major League Baseball players from Canada
Elmira Colonels players
Scranton Miners players
Portsmouth Cobblers players
Lowell Tigers players
New Britain Sinks players